Silas Hite (born March 30, 1980) is an American multi-instrumentalist, composer, record producer, and visual artist.

Early life
Hite began playing drums when he was eleven, studying with jazz drummer Mel Zelnick. He taught himself guitar and bass and sang in the choir at The Orme School. He later studied music, art, and business at The University of Arizona.
His music focus was in percussion performance and experimental composition. He also studied at the University's recording studio.

Career
Silas began his professional career at Mutato Muzika, a music production company owned by his uncle, composer and co-founder of Devo, Mark Mothersbaugh.
From 2003 to 2010, Silas scored and co-scored many films, television shows, video games, and commercials as an in-house composer and session musician. During this time he worked on many memorable commercial campaigns including "one of the most popular viral ad campaigns of all time," Burger King's "Subservient Chicken" campaign which won a Grand Clio and Cannes Cyber Gold Lion in Viral Marketing. Another notable collaboration was Apple Inc.'s Get a Mac campaign with 66 different iterations (not including many more new spots in the UK and Japan) appearing on television and in Apple Inc. stores in the United States, Canada, Australia, New Zealand, the United Kingdom, and Japan from 2006 to 2009. The long-running popular campaign was named "Campaign of the Decade" by Adweek and won many awards such as a Grand Effie Award in 2007.

In 2010, Hite left Mutato Muzika to become a freelance composer. He now works from his personal studio where he continues to score many films, television shows, commercials and video games.

In 2013, Hite began a string of successful collaborations with artist and filmmaker John Herschend. Most notably he scored "Stories From the Evacuation", commissioned for the San Francisco Museum of Modern Art, and "Discussion Questions" for Whitney Biennial in 2014.

In 2014, he scored "Homeward Bound", an Emmy-winning public service announcement addressing homelessness in America.

In 2015, he scored multiple episodes of "Chef's Table," a Netflix Original Series. Each episode of the series profiles a single world-renowned chef and features a classically based score.

Besides composing scores, Hite is also a songwriter, producer, and performer, providing original songs for many of his projects. His songs have appeared in films such as "Nick & Norah's Infinite Playlist," Robert Williams' "Mr. Bitchin’", and "Circle of 8", and television programs such as Dance-a-Lot Robot (Disney), "Blue Mountain State" (Spike), "Duck Dynasty" (A&E), "Burn Notice" (USA Network), "Extreme Makeover: Home Edition" (ABC), and "UFC Ultimate Insider" (Fox Sports).

Hite teaches his own Commercial Scoring Workshop in partnership with Emmy-winning audio company iZotope and is often a guest lecturer at colleges and universities throughout the nation.

Visual art
Although best known for his music, Hite maintains a busy art career showing his extremely detailed pen and ink drawings in galleries. In 2014, he was part of several group shows around the country including "The 2nd Annual Coaster Show" at the La Luz de Jesus Gallery in Hollywood, California as well as a solo exhibition at St. Catherine University in Minnesota.
Earlier in the year Hite appeared in the February issue of art magazine Juxtapoz, talking about his art and music influences.

His freelance illustration work appears in web and print based media around the world, including the L.A. Record.

Filmography

Films
The Space Between Us (2015)
Saltwater Buddha (2015)
Discussion Questions (2014) Whitney Biennial
The Rebel From The Ghetto (Denmark) (2014) additional music
Smothered (2014)
Love in the Time of Monsters (2014) (Performer: "Thunderdikk") (Writer: Silas Hite)
Forever (2014) additional music
How To Make A Peanut Butter and Jelly Sandwich (2014) Short
Scenes From The Evacuation (2013) San Francisco MOMA
Real Life H-O-R-S-E! With Dave Franco & DeAndre Jordan (2013)
Robert Williams Mr. Bitchin''' (2013) DocumentaryStoned Debates II: Highlights (2012)Stoned Debates II: Subway vs Quiznos (2012)Stoned Debates I: Is Marriage an Outdated Institution (2012) Stoned Debates I: Highlights (2012)The Record Breakers (2012) DocumentaryRamona and Beezus (2010) additional musicHopelessly in June (2011)The Invention of Dr. Nakamats (2009) DocumentaryJunkyard (2009)Circle of Eight (2009) additional musicCloudy with a Chance of Meatballs (2009) Nick & Norah's Infinite Playlist (2008) additional musicNothing but the Truth (2007) additional musicFirst Decent (2005) additional music

Television
Street Food (TV series), Episode: Cebu, Philippines (2019)
Chef's Table (2015) 
Jagten (series Denmark) (2014) additional music 7.9.13 (series Denmark) (2014) Weed Country (series) (2014) (Performer: "Thunderdikk") (Writer: Silas Hite)Best Week Ever (series) (2013) (Performer: "Thunderdikk") (Writer: Silas Hite)Big Texas Heat (series) (2013) (Performer: "Thunderdikk") (Writer: Silas Hite)Brain Games (series) (2013) (Performer: "Thunderdikk") (Writer: Silas Hite)Car Lot Rescue (series) (2013) (Performer: "Thunderdikk") (Writer: Silas Hite)Gypsy Sisters Extra Bling (series) (2013) (Performer: "Thunderdikk") (Writer: Silas Hite)Lords of War (series) (2013) (Performer: "Thunderdikk") (Writer: Silas Hite)Pawn Stars (series) (2013) (Performer: "Thunderdikk") (Writer: Silas Hite)Bid and Destroy (series) (2012) (Performer: "Thunderdikk") (Writer: Silas Hite) Counting Cars (series) (2012) (Performer: "Thunderdikk") (Writer: Silas Hite) Flipped Off (series) (2012) (Performer: "Thunderdikk") (Writer: Silas Hite) Goldfathers (series) (2012) (Performer: "Thunderdikk") (Writer: Silas Hite)NY Ink (series) (2012) (Performer: "Thunderdikk") (Writer: Silas Hite) Celebrity House Hunting (series) (2012) (Performer: "Thunderdikk") (Writer: Silas Hite)Flipping Out (series) (2011) (Performer: "Thunderdikk") (Writer: Silas Hite) Extreme Makeover Home Edition (series) (2011) (Performer: "Thunderdikk") (Writer: Silas Hite) Outrageous Kid Parties (series) (2011) (Performer: "Thunderdikk") (Writer: Silas Hite)American Restoration (series) (2010) (Performer: "Thunderdikk") (Writer: Silas Hite) Blue Mountain State (series) (2010) additional music Bud House (series) (2010) (Performer: "Thunderdikk") (Writer: Silas Hite) Burn Notice (series) (2010) (Performer: "Thunderdikk") (Writer: Silas Hite)Mater's Tall Tales (series) (2010) additional musicDance-a-Lot Robot (series) (2010) additional musicFollow Me: The Search For The First MTV Twitter Jockey (series) (2010) (Performer: "Thunderdikk") (Writer: Silas Hite) Bad Girls Club (series) (2009) (Performer: "Thunderdikk") (Writer: Silas Hite)Sex News and Rock N Roll (series) (2008) (Performer: "Thunderdikk") (Writer: Silas Hite) Shaggy & Scooby-Doo Get a Clue! (series) (2006-2007) additional musicAll Grown Up! (series) (2005–2007) additional musicEureka (series) (2006) additional musicLAX (series) (2004-2005) additional music

Video Games
Finger Frenzy (2014) Disaster Hero (2013)Skate 3 (2010) additional music 
Academy of Champions (2009) additional music 
My Sims Agents (2009) additional music Boom Blox Bash Party (2009) additional musicMean Girls (2009) additional music
Wordsworth (2008) additional musicBoom Blox (2008) additional music
My Sims Kingdom (2007)MySims (2007) additional musicThe Simpsons Game (2007) additional music
The Sims 2 Castaway (2007) additional music
The Sims 2 Open For Business (2006) additional music
The Sims 2 University (2005) additional musicFrogger: Ancient Shadows (2005) additional musicThe Sims 2 (2004) additional musicThe Sims Mobile'' (2017) soundtrack

References

External links

Influences with Silas Hite in Justapoz magazine 
Interview about scoring Chef's Table with Silas Hite for iZotope
Interview with Silas Hite about scoring for art museums on ClassicalMPR
Interview about instruments and studio gear for Sonic Scoop
Interview about art and music in The Wild magazine

Living people
1980 births
Video game composers
American film score composers
American male film score composers
Musicians from Scottsdale, Arizona
21st-century American composers
21st-century American male musicians